Griffin Cove is the 800 m wide cove indenting for 260 m the northwest coast of Varna Peninsula, Livingston Island in the South Shetland Islands, Antarctica and entered between Gargoyle Bastion to the northeast and Organpipe Point to the southwest.

The feature is named after the griffin, a legendary bird often portrayed as a monster.

Location

Maps
 L.L. Ivanov et al. Antarctica: Livingston Island and Greenwich Island, South Shetland Islands. Scale 1:100000 topographic map. Sofia: Antarctic Place-names Commission of Bulgaria, 2005.
 L.L. Ivanov. Antarctica: Livingston Island and Greenwich, Robert, Snow and Smith Islands. Scale 1:120000 topographic map.  Troyan: Manfred Wörner Foundation, 2009.

References
Composite Antarctic Gazetteer.

Coves of Livingston Island